Alfred Leslie Young (born July 1, 1942), was an American politician who was a member of the Oregon House of Representatives. He was a bricklayer.

References

1942 births
Living people
Democratic Party members of the Oregon House of Representatives
People from Clearfield County, Pennsylvania
Politicians from Hillsboro, Oregon
American bricklayers